Bittertown is the fourth studio album by American singer-songwriter Lori McKenna. The album was first released in 2004 on Signature Sounds. It was produced by Lorne Entress and features prominently the guitar work of Kevin Barry. After country singer Faith Hill covered three of McKenna's songs for her album, Fireflies, Warner Bros. Records signed McKenna to their label and re-released it under their name in 2005. All songs were written by McKenna. "Bible Song" was covered by country singer Sara Evans for her album Real Fine Place. In July 2019, McKenna released an album named Return to Bittertown, consisting of “Stealing Kisses” and “Bible Song” which she had re-recorded to commemorate the 15th Anniversary of the release of Bittertown. McKenna also embarked on a tour (Return to Bittertown Tour) to promote this album. McKenna defines Bittertown as the “game changer” for her, the album which brought her to the attention of Faith Hill.

The album never charted.

Track listing 
All songs were written by Lori McKenna
 Bible Song - 3:48
 Mr. Sunshine - 4:03
 One Man - 4:17
 Pour - 3:50
 Lone Star - 4:10
 Stealing Kisses - 4:24
 If You Ask - 4:29
 Monday Afternoon - 3:04
 The Ledge - 3:40
 My Sweetheart - 4:05
 Cowardly Lion - 3:34
 Silver Bus - 4:00
 One Kiss Goodnight - 4:19

References 

2004 albums
Lori McKenna albums